Bhreathnach is a surname. Notable people with the surname include:

 Edel Bhreathnach, Irish historian and academic
 Gearóidín Bhreathnach, Irish singer
 Linda Bhreathnach (born 1983), Irish television actress
 Niamh Bhreathnach (born 1945), Irish politician

See also
 Breathnach